Michael David Jones (born August 25, 1969) is a defensive end who played nine seasons in the National Football League for four teams. He attended North Carolina State University.

Early life

Mike Jones was born and raised in Columbia, South Carolina,  where he played football for his father at CA Johnson High School .  As a senior he was selected as first-team All-State Tight End and Linebacker and was elected to play in the 50th annual NC vs. SC Shrine Bowl.  After receiving scholarship offers from over 30 schools around the country Jones decided to attend NC State University . Jones earned 4 varsity letters at N.C.State and as a 3-year starter earned all ACC honors as a senior.

NFL career

Jones was drafted in the second round in 1991 by the Arizona Cardinals (one pick Ahead of Brett Favre) and played for 3 years.  As a free agent Jones signed with the New England Patriots where he played for Coach Bill Parcells for 4 years.  In 1996 he was elected Captain of a Patriots team that would go on to be AFC champions and Play in Super Bowl 31 vs. The Green Bay Packers.  After playing the 1998 season with the St. Louis Rams, Jones signed with the Tennessee Titans in what would be his final season as a Professional Football player in the NFL.  After a miraculous season which finished with an incredible playoff run and a 23-16 loss to the St. Louis Rams in Super Bowl XXXIV, Jones called it a career and decided to retire. Ironically, the player making the tackle on the final play to clinch the Super Bowl for the Rams was also named Mike Jones.

Personal life

Jones is the father of entertainer Coco Jones and current LSU linebacker Mike Jones Jr.

References

1969 births
Living people
Players of American football from Columbia, South Carolina
American football defensive ends
NC State Wolfpack football players
Arizona Cardinals players
New England Patriots players
St. Louis Rams players
Tennessee Titans players